Paul Anthony Insel (born 1945) is an American physician and pharmacologist. He has been the chief editor of four academic journals and is an elected fellow of the American Association for the Advancement of Science, American Society for Pharmacology and Experimental Therapeutics, and American Physiological Society. His research is primarily focused on G proteins.

Early life and education
Paul Anthony Insel was born in 1945 in New York City to parents H. Herbert Insel and Ruth Leona . He has three brothers, Richard, Jonathan, and Thomas R. Insel. He grew up in Dayton, Ohio and the outskirts of Washington, D.C. He attended George Washington University for two years before attending the University of Michigan, where he graduated with his Doctor of Medicine in 1968.

Career
He completed an internship and residency with Harvard University at Boston City Hospital after finishing his MD; he worked at Boston City Hospital until 1970. He then worked at the National Institutes of Health at the  National Institute of Child Health and Human Development and Gerontology Research Center from 1970 to 1974. His next position was at the University of California, San Francisco as a research fellow and associate professor in pharmacology. Insel joined the faculty of the University of California, San Diego (UCSD) in 1978, where he has taught and researched to present day. He became a full professor at UCSD in 1987. He is the Distinguished Professor of Pharmacology and Medicine and one of the co-directors of the UCSD Medical Scientist (MD/PhD) Training Program. From 2017 to 2019 he was a Distinguished Scientist at the Merck & Co. laboratory in San Francisco.

Insel primarily researches G proteins, including G protein-coupled receptors, heterotrimeric G-proteins and G protein-regulated effectors. He succeeded Arthur K. Cho as the editor of the Annual Review of Pharmacology and Toxicology in 2008. He remains the editor as of 2020. He has also been the chief editor of the Journal of Clinical Investigation, Molecular Pharmacology, and American Journal of Physiology Cell Physiology.

Awards and honors
Insel was elected as a fellow of the British Pharmacological Society in 2017. He also has an honorary doctorate from the University of Paris. In 2019, he was elected as a fellow of the American Society for Pharmacology and Experimental Therapeutics. He is additionally a fellow of the American Association for the Advancement of Science and American Physiological Society, and is an elected member of the American Society for Clinical Investigation and Association of American Physicians.

Personal life
His first marriage was to Lola Steinbaum in 1968. He later married Louise , a psychiatric nurse, in 1977. The couple had two daughters and divorced by 1993.

References

Living people
1945 births
University of Michigan Medical School alumni
National Institutes of Health people
University of California, San Francisco faculty
University of California, San Diego faculty
Fellows of the American Association for the Advancement of Science
Fellows of the American Physical Society
American physicians
American pharmacologists
Physicians from New York City
Fellows of the American Society for Pharmacology and Experimental Therapeutics
Journal of Clinical Investigation editors
Annual Reviews (publisher) editors